The Inner Sydney Montessori School (abbreviated as ISMS)  is a dual-campus independent nonsectarian Montessori coeducational early learning and primary day school, with campuses located in Balmain and Lilyfield, inner-western suburbs of Sydney, New South Wales, Australia.

See also 

 List of non-government schools in New South Wales
 List of Montessori schools

References

External links 
 School website

Private primary schools in Sydney
Montessori schools in Australia
Educational institutions established in 1981
1981 establishments in Australia
Balmain, New South Wales
Lilyfield, New South Wales